Triatoma is a genus of assassin bug in the subfamily Triatominae (kissing bugs). The members of Triatoma (like all members of Triatominae) are blood-sucking insects that can transmit serious diseases, such as Chagas disease. Their saliva may also trigger allergic reactions in sensitive individuals, up to and including severe anaphylactic shock.

Species
These are species according to reliable sources. While most species are found in the New World, a few are known from the Old World.
NOTE: The designation (Tc) signifies that the species is associated with Trypanosoma cruzi.
 Triatoma amicitiae Lent, 1951
 Triatoma arthurneivai Lent & Martins, 1940
 Triatoma bahiensis Sherlock & Serafim, 1967
 Triatoma baratai Carcavallo & Jurberg, 2000
 Triatoma barberi Usinger, 1939
 Triatoma bolivari Carcavallo, Martínez & Pelaez, 1984
 Triatoma boliviana Avendaño, 2007
 Triatoma bouvieri Larrousse, 1924
 Triatoma brailovskyi Martínez, Carcavallo & Pelaez, 1984
 Triatoma brasiliensis Neiva, 1911
 Triatoma breyeri Del Ponte, 1929, possible synonym of Mepraia breyeri
 Triatoma carcavalloi Jurberg, Rocha & Lent, 1998
 Triatoma carrioni Larrousse, 1926
 Triatoma cavernicola Else & Cheong, 1977
 Triatoma circummaculata (Stål, 1859)
 Triatoma costalimai Verano & Galvão, 1959
 Triatoma deaneorum Galvão, Souza & Lima, 1967
 Triatoma delpontei Romaña & Abalos, 1947
 Triatoma dimidiata (Latreille, 1811)   (Tc) [important vector in parts of Mexico, Central America, Colombia and Ecuador].
 Triatoma dispar Lent, 1950
 Triatoma garciabesi Carcavallo, 1967
 Triatoma gerstaeckeri (Stål, 1859)
 Triatoma gomeznunezi Martínez, Carcavallo & Jurberg, 1994
 Triatoma guasayana Wygodzinsky & Abalos, 1949
 Triatoma guazu Lent & Wygodzinsky, 1979
 Triatoma hegneri Mazzotti, 1940
 Triatoma huehuetenanguensis Lima-Cordón, 2019  (Tc)
 Triatoma incrassata Usinger, 1939
 Triatoma indictiva Neiva, 1912
 Triatoma infestans (Klug, 1834)
 Triatoma jatai Gonçalves, 2013
 Triatoma juazeirensis Costa & Felix, 2007
 Triatoma jurbergi Carcavallo, Galvão & Lent, 1998
 Triatoma klugi Carcavallo, Jurberg, Lent & Galvão, 2001
 Triatoma lecticularia (Stål, 1859)
 Triatoma lenti Sherlock & Serafim, 1967
 Triatoma leopoldi (Schouteden, 1933)
 Triatoma limai Del Ponte, 1929
 Triatoma maculata (Erichson, 1848)
 Triatoma matogrossensis Leite & Barbosa, 1953
 Triatoma melanocephala Neiva & Pinto, 1923
 Triatoma mexicana (Herrich-Schaeffer, 1848)
 Triatoma migrans Breddin, 1903
 Triatoma mopan Dorn, 2018  (Tc)
 Triatoma neotomae Neiva, 1911
 Triatoma nigromaculata (Stål, 1872)
 Triatoma nitida Usinger, 1939
 Triatoma oliveirai (Neiva, Pinto & Lent, 1939)
 Triatoma patagonica Del Ponte, 1929
 Triatoma peninsularis Usinger, 1940
 Triatoma petrochiae Pinto & Barreto, 1925
 Triatoma pintodiasi Jurberg, Cunha & Rocha, 2013
 Triatoma platensis Neiva, 1913
 Triatoma protracta (Uhler, 1894) (western conenose)
 Triatoma pseudomaculata Correa & Espínola, 1964
 Triatoma pugasi Lent, 1953
 Triatoma recurva (Stål, 1868)
 Triatoma rubida (Uhler, 1894)
 Triatoma rubrofasciata (De Geer, 1773)
 Triatoma rubrovaria (Blanchard, 1843)
 Triatoma ryckmani Zeledón & Ponce, 1972
 Triatoma sanguisuga (Leconte, 1856) (eastern blood-sucking conenose)
 Triatoma sherlocki Papa, Jurberg, Carcavallo, Cerqueira & Barata, 2002
 Triatoma sinaloensis Ryckman, 1962
 Triatoma sinica Hsiao, 1965
 Triatoma sordida (Stal, 1859)
 Triatoma tibiamaculata (Pinto, 1926)
 Triatoma vandae Carcavallo, Jurberg, Rocha, Galvão, Noireau & Lent, 2002
 Triatoma venosa (Stal, 1872)
 Triatoma vitticeps (Stål, 1859)
 Triatoma williami Galvão, Souza & Lima, 1965
 Triatoma wygodzinskyi Lent, 1951

Fossil taxa:
 †Triatoma dominicana Poinar, 2005

References

External links
 Information on Triatoma infestans and other members of Triatominae, by Andreas Rose
 ECLAT, European Community Latin American Network for Research on the Biology and Control of Triatominae
 more external links see: Triatominae

Reduviidae
Insect vectors of human pathogens
Taxa named by François-Louis Laporte, comte de Castelnau